The crossed-fork back golden-line fish (Sinocyclocheilus furcodorsalis) is a species of blind cave fish in the family Cyprinidae. It is endemic to the Guangxi province in southern China, and only known from an underground stream in Tian'e County.

Description
Sinocyclocheilus furcodorsalis grow to  standard length. They are eyeless. The body is depigmented, semi-transparent and whitish in colour.

References 

Sinocyclocheilus
Cave fish
Endemic fauna of Guangxi
Freshwater fish of China
Fish described in 1997